Mortdale is a suburb located in southern Sydney, in the state of New South Wales, Australia. Mortdale is located 20 kilometres south of the Sydney central business district and is part of the St George area. Mortdale is situated in the local government area of Georges River Council. Mortdale extends south to Lime Kiln Bay, on the Georges River. Mortdale Heights is a locality in the western corner of the suburb.

History

Mortdale has been known in the past as Mort's Road, Mort's Hill, Mort's Crossing, Mort's Township and Mort Dale. The suburb was named after Sydney industrialist Thomas Sutcliffe Mort (1816–1878), who was famous for pioneering the refrigeration of shipping meat and the construction of Mort's Dock, Balmain. Thomas Mort purchased the land from Robert Townson (1763–1827), who had been granted land in the Hurstville area with his brother John Townson.

A small farming community started when the land around Mort's Road was subdivided into 17 farms. The Hurstville Steam Brick Company (better known as Judds Brickworks) was established in 1884 by William George Judd. The large brick-making chimneys were easily seen from around the district. The first residences were built opposite the Brickworks in 1885.
The railway was extended through the district around the same time. The railway divided two of the main farms, Kemp's orange orchard and Parkes's farm near Victoria Avenue, and these were subdivided for housing by 1894. The official title for the suburb was set as Mortdale when the railway station opened with that name on 20 March 1897.

The school opened in January 1889, and the post office and grocery store opened in November. Mortdale became a popular residential suburb in 1920s for soldiers returning from World War I.

In 1921, there was a movement for Mortdale to split from Hurstville and form a separate municipality. An official 1923 inquiry into the proposed Municipality of Mortdale decided against the change, despite the separation movement having the law behind them.

At the same time there was also a push to have the name of Mortdale changed due to its similarity with the suburb of Mortlake and the association with its literal translation from Latin ('Valley of the Dead'). Suggestions by various groups over several years included: Leyton, Montrose, Morella, Kingrose and Boronia. A final list approved by the Department of Lands were: Carruthers, Princemead, Wyargine, and Storrieville, but the matter was never resolved.

Commercial area
Mortdale consists mainly of residential dwellings with some commercial and industrial developments in the north-west corner. The main shopping centre is located on Morts Road and Pitt Street, near Mortdale railway station. Commercial and industrial developments are located along Boundary Road.

A number of streets near the commercial area are named after notable streets in the Sydney CBD; These include: George Street, Martin Place, Pitt Street, Macquarie Place and Oxford Street. This is the only group of Sydney-wide streets named as such.

Transport
Mortdale railway station is on the Eastern Suburbs & Illawarra Line of the Sydney Trains network. Mortdale is a 30min (approx) train journey from the city. Punchbowl Bus Company services 944, 945 and 955 run throughout the week, with limited services on weekends.

Churches
 Christ Church Anglican
 Mortdale Uniting Church
 Mortdale Oatley Baptist Church
 Church of Jesus Christ of Latter Day Saints (Mormons)
 Hurstville District Christadelphian Ecclesia
 Mortdale Spiritual Church

Schools
 Mortdale Public School
 Carinya Special School
 Marist College Penshurst
 Penshurst West Public School

Parks and Waterways
 Mortdale Memorial Park, Renown Park, Jubilee Park, Hurstville Golf Course, Mick Downes Reserve, Oatley Heights Park, Lime Kiln Bay Reserve, Olds Park, Edith Park, Beatty Street Reserve, Ruby Wing Reserve, Paddy Tyler Reserve, Milsop Place Reserve, Sunlea Avenue Reserve, Treloar Avenue Reserve, Walter Street Reserve, Nicol Murray Reserve, Lesley Crescent Reserve, 
 
 Georges River, Lime Kiln Bay, Dairy Creek

Landmarks
 Historic Buildings - Mortdale Fire Station, Old Police Station, Mortdale Hotel, Mortdale railway station, Mortdale RSL Club, Mortdale Bowling Club (demolished 2012), St George Masonic Club, Mortdale Scout Hall, Mortdale Senior Citizens Centre, Ellen Subway underpass.
 Mortdale Memorial Park - Contains a perimeter of large Small-leaved Fig trees, a classical rotunda and a decorative War Memorial. The park is popular for picnics, weddings, and concerts.

Sport
 Hurstville Golf Course - 18-hole golf course 
 Ken Rosewall Tennis Centre - 8 tennis courts adjoining the golf course
 Renown United Rugby League Club - play at Renown Park, Mortdale
 Mortdale Heights Cricket Club - play at Oatley Park Oval
 Hurstville Small Bore Range - rimfire shooting rifle range opposite the golf course
 Beatty Street Reserve - Cricket Nets
 Jubilee Park - netball court

Pop culture
Mortdale has been colloquially referred to as the "Valley of the Dead" or "Death Valley", due to the Latin mort ("death") and English dale ("valley"). 
In 1992, Su Cruickshank, published a book entitled 'Bring A Plate to The Mortdale Scout Hall - The Autobiography of a Fat Tart Complete with Recipes'.

Population

Demographics
English was stated as the only language spoken at home by 62.6% of residents, and the most common other languages spoken were Mandarin 8.1%, Cantonese 5.2%, Greek 2.9%, Macedonian 2.7%, and Nepali 2.4% . The most common responses for religious affiliation were no religion 32.1%, Catholic 24.4%, Anglican 11.2% and Orthodox 8.0%, with religion not stated being 4.7%.

Mortdale households consisted of 50.3% occupied by 2 parent families, single parent families 12.9%, 35.2% by couples with no children at home, and 1.4% by others. 31.8% of households were purchasing their homes, 28.7% were renting, and 37.3% were owned outright (others not stated).

There were 56.4% of these in separate houses, semi-detached 13.8%, and 29% in apartments. 41.0% had one vehicle, and 34.7% had 2.

Notable residents
 Mark Gasnier - St George Rugby league footballer
 Reg Gasnier - St George Rugby league footballer
 J. H. Leonard - illustrator
 Billy Smith - St George Rugby league footballer
 Ruby Violet Payne-Scott (1912-1981) - physicist, radio astronomer and schoolteacher

Mortdale Heights
Mortdale Heights is a waterfront locality located between the Georges River and the western edge of the suburb of Mortdale in southern Sydney, in the state of New South Wales, Australia. Mortdale Heights is located 20 kilometres south of the Sydney central business district in the local government area of the Georges River Council.

This small, elevated area is bounded on the south by Oatley Heights Park and Lime Kiln Bay, and on the west by Hurstville Golf Course. It is known for the unusual choice of its street names, as most begin with the letter "B" and have a Scottish heritage.

History
The name "Mortdale Heights" was in use by 1919, but there only scattered residences in the area. The estate was not fully subdivided for sale until 1924 when a subdivision of 300 allotments was made available. The area did not fully develop until shortly after World War II.

Culture
 A row of around 12 shops was built along Balmoral Road during the 1950s. Many of these have since been converted into residences
 Beatty Street Reserve incorporates part of an old Quarry site (originally known as Hannon's Quarry) that was cleared by the Mortdale Heights Progress Association in 1954. A children's playground was built on the top section in 1955. Cricket nets were later installed in the quarry section.
 The Girl Guides Hall is situated beside Beatty Street Reserve
 The Mortdale Heights Cricket Club was founded in 1957 and is one of the oldest clubs participating in the Georges River St George District Cricket Association's competitions. Their home games are played at Oatley Park Oval
 Lime Kiln Bay Reserve, Oatley Heights Park, is a natural bushland area surrounding Lime Kiln Bay which extends into nearby Oatley Park

References

Suburbs of Sydney
Populated places established in 1855
Georges River Council
1855 establishments in Australia